The National Defence Army is a militant organisation in Nepal which seeks to restore the Nepalese monarchy which was abolished in 2008.

Activities
The group has claimed credit for two attacks in Nepal:
2007, July:  killing of a missionary in eastern Nepal.
2008, May:  bombing of the Christian Church of the Assumption in Lalitpur - two people were killed and a dozen injured.

Sources
Blast rips through Nepal church, Al Jazeera.net.  Saturday, May 23, 2009.

References

Rebel groups in Nepal
Terrorism in Nepal
Monarchist organizations
Monarchism in Nepal
2008 establishments in Nepal